Jan Christiaensz Micker (1598 in Amsterdam – 1664 in Amsterdam), was a Dutch Golden Age landscape painter.

Biography
Houbraken mentioned him as a "gemeen schilder" who was the first drawing teacher of Jan Baptist Weenix.

According to the RKD besides being the first teacher of Jan Baptist Weenix he painted staffage in paintings by Jan Fransz Dammeroen, Hans Jurriaensz van Baden and Joachim Govertsz Camphuysen. In 1653 he lived on the Prinsengracht across from the Noorderkerk in the house called 't Wapen van Amsterdam. When he died he lived on the Lindengracht, and was buried in the Noorderkerk.

References

 
Jan Christiaensz. Micker on Artnet

1598 births
1664 deaths
Dutch Golden Age painters
Dutch male painters
Painters from Amsterdam